Raoul Vaneigem (born 21 March 1934) is a Belgian writer known for his 1967 book The Revolution of Everyday Life.

He was born in Lessines (Hainaut, Belgium) and studied romance philology at the Free University of Brussels from 1952 to 1956. He was a member of the Situationist International from 1961 to 1970.

Biography
Vaneigem and Guy Debord were two of the principal theorists of the Situationist movement. Vaneigem's slogans frequently made it onto the walls of Paris during the May 1968 uprisings. His most famous book, and the one that contains the most famous slogans, is The Revolution of Everyday Life. In it, he challenged what he called "passive nihilism", a passive acceptance of the absurdities of modernism which he considered "an overture to conformism".

According to the website nothingness.org,

The voice of Raoul Vaneigem was one of the strongest of the Situationists. Counterpoised to Guy Debord's political and polemic style, Vaneigem offered a more poetic and spirited prose. The Revolution of Everyday Life (Traité de savoir-vivre à l'usage des jeunes générations), published in the same year as [Debord's] The Society of the Spectacle, helped broaden and balance the presentation of the SI's theories and practices. One of the longest SI members, and frequent editor of the journal Internationale Situationniste, Vaneigem finally left the SI in November 1970, citing their failures as well as his own in his letter of resignation. Soon after, Debord issued a typically scathing response denouncing both Vaneigem and his critique of the Situationist International.

After leaving the Situationist International, Vaneigem wrote a series of polemical books defending the idea of a free and self-regulating social order. He frequently made use of pseudonyms, including "Ratgeb", "Julienne de Cherisy," "Robert Desessarts," "Jules-François Dupuis," "Tristan Hannaniel," "Anne de Launay," and "Michel Thorgal." Further on, he defended freedom of speech in Nothing is sacred, everything can be said, edited by Robert and Emmanuelle Ménard, to whom the philosopher Michel Onfray dedicated his Traité d'athéologie, and later on Bruno Gaccio and Dieudonné M'bala M'bala, responded in Can everything can be said ?, prefaced again by Robert Ménard.

Partial bibliography 
 The Revolution of Everyday Life (Traité de savoir-vivre à l'usage des jeunes générations)
 Traité de savoir-vivre à l'usage des jeunes générations
 Le livre des plaisirs (The Book of Pleasures), 1979, reprinted 1993.
 L'Ile aux delices (The Island of Delights), an erotic novel, 1979.
 Le mouvement du libre-esprit (The Movement of the Free Spirit), 1986.
 Adresse aux vivants sur la mort qui les gouverne et l'opportunité de s'en défaire, 1990
 Lettre de Staline à ses enfants enfin réconciliés de l'Est et de l'Ouest, 1992
 La résistance au christianisme. Les hérésies des origines au XVIIIe siècle, 1993
 Les hérésies, 1994
 Avertissement aux écoliers et lycéens, 1995
 Nous qui désirons sans fin, 1996
 La Paresse, 1996
 Notes sans portée, 1997
 Dictionnaire de citations pour servir au divertissement et à l'intelligence du temps, 1998
 Déclaration des droits de l'être humain. De la souveraineté de la vie comme dépassement des droits de le l'homme, 2001
 Pour une internationale du genre humain, 2001
 Salut à Rabelais ! Une lecture au présent, 2003
 Rien n'est sacré, tout peut se dire. Réflexions sur la liberté d'expression, 2003
 Le Chevalier, la Dame, le Diable et la Mort, 2003
 Modestes propositions aux grévistes, 2004
 Journal imaginaire, 2005

References

Further reading 
 Pol Charles, Vaneigem l'insatiable, L'Age d'Homme, Lausanne, Suisse, 2002, 
 Grégory Lambrette, Raoul Vaneigem, St-Georges d'Oléron-Bruxelles, Editions Libertaires/Editions d'Alternative Libertaire, coll. Graine d'ananar, 2002
 Laurent Six, Raoul Vaneigem. L'éloge de la vie affinée, Avin, Luce Wilquin, coll. L'Oeuvre en Lumière, 2004
 Christian Adam, « Oublier Vaneigem » (pp. 5–83), in Résignez-vous !, Edilivre, Paris, 2015 (very critical pamphlet against Vaneigem's optimism).

External links 
 English and French texts on nothingness.org library
 24+ French and German texts availed as part of the Smirkers-of-the-World.org Translinguistics project
 English texts availed as part of the Lust-for-Life.org open library project
 Vaneigem archive at Libcom.org
 The Decline and Fall of Work free mp3 recording of Vaneigem's essay of the same name, from the Audio Anarchy project
 Raoul Vaneigem Papers. General Collection, Beinecke Rare Book and Manuscript Library, Yale University.

1934 births
Living people
People from Lessines
Belgian writers in French
Free University of Brussels (1834–1969) alumni
Situationists
Critics of work and the work ethic
Refusal of work
Anti-consumerists
Walloon people
Philosophers of technology